One Track Mind is the fourth studio album by American rock band Psychic Ills. It was released on February 19, 2013, by Sacred Bones Records.

Critical reception

At Metacritic, which assigns a normalized rating out of 100 to reviews from mainstream critics, the album has an average score of 70 based on 13 reviews, indicating "generally favorable reviews".

Track listing

References

2013 albums
Psychic Ills albums
Sacred Bones Records albums